The blue butterfish (Stromateus fiatola), is a species of pelagic fish in the genus Stromateus.

Description 
Dorsal soft rays (total): 42-50 cm; Anal soft rays: 33 - 38 cm. Blue to brownish in color and darker spots dorsally, silver to whitish ventrally; juveniles with vertical bars on body and small black pelvic fins.

Distribution and habitat 
It mainly lives in the Atlantic ocean and is widely distributed in the eastern Atlantic Ocean, specifically in the Bay of Biscay, the Mediterranean, southward of the cape of good hope, and South Africa.

Diet 
The blue butterfish feeds on smaller fishes, jellyfish, and zooplankton. This fish is part of the trophic guild, planktotrophic, which means that they have a long pelagic larval stage and feed on their prey while suspended in the water column. The blue butterfish is also referred to as a pelagic mesopredator due to feeding on smaller animals within the pelagic zone.

Reproduction 
The blue butterfish undergoes sexual reproduction. The reproduction is both oviparous ( female animals that lay their eggs, with little or no other embryonic development within the mother) and iteroparous (an organism that can undergo many reproductive events within its lifetime).

Cultural 
Names of blue butterfish in other languages as follows: Bukla (Albanian), Ψευτολίτσα (Pseftolitsa) (Greek), Palometa fiatola (Spanish), Fieto (Italian), Blauer Butterfisch (German), Żuwak fiatola (Polish), Pampo-godinho (Portuguese), Фиатола (Fiatola) (Russian), Plotica morska (Serbian, Croatian), Figa (Slovenian), Yıldız balığı (Turkish), Fiatole (French).

See also 

 Silver pomfret
 Harvestfish

References

External links 

Fish of the Atlantic Ocean
Taxa named by Carl Linnaeus
Stromateidae